Nargis (Urdu: نرگس) is a Pakistani film actress, stage dancer, and mujra performer. She has acted in more than 104 films in her career spanning from 1993 to 2018, and was the highest-paid stage artist across the country in 2016.
She is best known for her supporting role in musical romantic film Choorian (1998 film), which ranks amongst the highest-grossing domestic films of all time. Her other notable films include International Luteray (1994), Ghunda Raj (1994), Soha Jora (2007), and Dushman Rani (2014).

Awards and recognition
Nigar Awards for 'Best Supporting Actress' in Punjabi language films Madam Rani in 1995 and in Kala Raj (1997)

Selected filmography

References

External links 
  
 Nargis filmography at IMDb

Living people
20th-century Pakistani actresses
21st-century Pakistani actresses
Nigar Award winners
Pakistani female dancers
Pakistani film actresses
Pakistani stage actresses
Year of birth missing (living people)